is a Japanese manga series written and illustrated by Hideo Yamamoto. It was serialized in Shogakukan's seinen manga magazine Weekly Big Comic Spirits from March 2003 to February 2011, with its chapters collected in 15 tankōbon volumes. A live-action film adaptation, directed by Takashi Shimizu and starring Gō Ayano premiered in April 2021.

Plot
Trepanation is the procedure of drilling holes in a person's head, supposedly increasing the circulation of blood and helping to improve the pressure inside one's skull, bringing out a person's sixth sense and causing them to gain superhuman powers such as ESP, being able to see ghosts, and controlling objects remotely with one's mind. This is speculative fiction based on the concept of trepanation.

Susumu Nakoshi is a 34-year-old homeless man living out of his car. For two weeks, he has declined his fellow homeless men's invitations to set up a tent with them, preferring to sleep in his car. However, one day, he is accosted by a strange-looking man searching for participants to subject themselves to trepanation. Nakoshi tells the man to leave, and discards the flier he'd placed on his windshield. However, when his car is towed, he agrees to let medical student Manabu Itoh drill a hole in his skull in exchange for 700,000 yen. Itoh claims to be interested in trepanation for the sake of science; he is interested in humans, fascinated with ESP and the sixth sense, and wants to disprove the existence of the occult. Itoh's father owns a lab facility, as his father is a rich hospital director. Itoh performs the trepanation surgery on Nakoshi and does a variety of ESP tests. When Nakoshi reveals that he sees distorted humans when using only the left side of his body, Itoh researches and discovers that Nakoshi can see homunculi.

Itoh explains psychoanalytic theory to Nakoshi after the yakuza incident.

Characters

A 34-year-old man. At the beginning of the series, he is shown to be recently homeless and living out of his car. He is living between two worlds, that of the upper class and that of the homeless. He is a former employee of a foreign bank, and a pathological liar. After the trepanation procedure, he gains the ability to see peoples homunculi or "distortions".

A 22-year-old medical student who proposes the trepanation experiment and investigates material relevant to Nakoshi's reports. She is transgender, but hides this fact from her ailing father, a high-ranking doctor at a hospital whom she has a strained relationship with.
/1775
A 17-year-old girl working in a burusera salon and one of the first homunculi Nakoshi interacts with.

Media

Manga
Homunculus, written and illustrated by Hideo Yamamoto, was serialized in Shogakukan's Weekly Big Comic Spirits from March 17, 2003, to February 21, 2011. Shogakukan collected its chapters in fifteen tankōbon volumes, released from July 30, 2003 to April 28, 2011. The manga is licensed in North America by Seven Seas Entertainment who will release the series in an omnibus format.

Volume list

Original edition

New edition

Live-action film
In September 2020, it was announced that Homunculus would receive a live-action film adaptation. The film is directed by Takashi Shimizu and stars Gō Ayano. It premiered in Japan on April 2, 2021, and premiered exclusively on Netflix worldwide on April 22.

Reception
As of September 2020, the Homunculus manga had over 4 million copies in circulation.

References

External links
  
 

Films directed by Takashi Shimizu
Live-action films based on manga
Manga adapted into films
Psychological horror anime and manga
Psychological thriller anime and manga
Seinen manga
Seven Seas Entertainment titles
Shogakukan manga
Japanese psychological horror films
Japanese psychological thriller films